HM Prison Manchester is a Category A and B men's prison in Manchester, England, operated by His Majesty's Prison Service. It is still commonly referred to as Strangeways, which was its former official name derived from the area in which it is located, until it was rebuilt following a major riot in 1990.

It is a local prison, holding prisoners remanded into custody from courts in the Manchester area and Category A prisoners (those held under maximum security conditions).

The prison featured an execution chamber prior to the abolition of capital punishment in the United Kingdom in the 1960s; the last execution at the prison took place in 1964.

Strangeways was designed by Alfred Waterhouse and opened in 1868 alongside the demolished Manchester Assize Courts. The prison is known for its prominent ventilation tower and imposing design, structured by the principles of the separate system.

History

Construction of the Grade II listed prison was completed in 1869, and it was opened on 25 June 1869, to replace the New Bailey Prison in Salford, which closed in 1868. The prison, designed by Alfred Waterhouse in 1862 with input from Joshua Jebb, cost £170,000 and had a capacity of 1,000 inmates. Its  ventilation tower (often mistaken for a watchtower) has become a local landmark. The prison's walls, which are rumoured to be 16 feet thick, are said to be impenetrable from either inside or out.

The prison has an element of the separate system with its plan in the form of a star or a snowflake, with two blocks housing ten wings that emanate from a central core where the ventilation tower is situated. The prison consists of two radial blocks branching from the central core with a total of ten wings (A, B, C, D, E, F  in one block, and  G, H, I, K in the second).

The jail was built on the grounds of Strangeways Park and Gardens, from which it was named. Strangeways was recorded in 1322 as Strangwas from the Anglo-Saxon Strang and gewæsc meaning "[a place by] a stream with a strong current".

The prison was open to male and female prisoners until 1963 when the facility became male-only, and in 1980 it began to accept remand prisoners. As of 2005 the prison held more than 1,200 inmates.

As a place of execution

Originally, the prison contained an execution shed in B wing and after World War I a special execution room and cell for the condemned criminal was built. Strangeways was one of the few prisons to have permanent gallows. The first execution at Strangeways was that of twenty-year-old murderer Michael Johnson, who was hanged by William Calcraft on 29 March 1869.

Twenty-nine hangings took place over the next twenty years and 71 took place in the 20th century, bringing the total number to 100. During the second half of the century, the number of executions decreased, with no hangings between 1954 and 28 November 1962, when James Smith was executed. John Robson Walby (alias Gwynne Owen Evans), one of the last two people to be hanged in England, was executed here on 13 August 1964. Out of the 100 hangings, four were double hangings, while the rest were done individually. The "quickest hanging" of James Inglis, in seven seconds, carried out by Albert Pierrepoint, took place here.

Other executions
John Jackson was executed on 7 August 1879.
Mary Ann Britland (38) was executed on 9 August 1886 for the murder of two family members and her neighbour. She was the first woman to be executed at the prison.
Thom Davies was hanged on 9 January 1889 for sexual deviancy charges.
Lieutenant Frederick Rothwell Holt was hanged on 13 April 1920 for the murder of twenty-six-year-old Kathleen Breaks.
Louie Calvert was hanged on 24 June 1926.
Doctor Buck Ruxton was executed on 12 May 1936 for the murder of his wife.  A petition for clemency was signed by 10,000 people, both sympathetic locals with high regard for this "people's doctor" and abolitionists who mounted a large demonstration on the day of his execution.
 Margaret Allen was hanged on 12 January 1949 by Albert Pierrepoint for the murder of an elderly widower.  Her execution was the first of a woman in Britain for twelve years and the third execution of a woman at Strangeways.
 After the seven second hanging, Albert Pierrepoint executed Louisa May Merrifield on 18 September 1953. She was the fourth and last woman to be executed at the prison.

The bodies of executed criminals were buried in unmarked graves within the prison walls, as was the custom. During prison rebuilding work in 1991, the remains of 63 executed prisoners (of which 45 were identifiable) were exhumed from unmarked graves in the prison cemetery and cremated at Blackley Crematorium in Manchester. The cremated remains were re-interred in two graves (plot C2710 and C2711) at the adjacent cemetery.

The following people were hanged at Manchester Prison between 1869 and 1964:

Strangeways riots

Between 1 April and 25 April 1990, 147 staff and 47 prisoners were injured in a series of riots by prison inmates. There was one fatality among the prisoners, and one prison officer died from heart failure. Much of the old prison was damaged or destroyed in the rioting. Several inmates were charged with various offences, and Paul Taylor and Alan Lord faced a five-month trial as ringleaders.

The riots resulted in the Woolf Inquiry, and the prison was rebuilt and renamed Her Majesty's Prison, Manchester. Repair and modernisation cost more than £80 million after the riot, and rebuilding was completed in 1994.

The prison post-1994
The prison is a high-security category A prison for adult males and has a maximum capacity of 1,269 as of 4 August 2008. Operation of the prison was put out to tender in 1994 and 2001. Accommodation is divided into nine wings in two radial blocks. Cells are a mixture of single and double occupancy, all having in-cell power points and integral sanitation.

The prison has become known for a high suicide rate following its reopening in 1994. From 1993 to 2003, Strangeways prison had the second highest number of suicides among inmates of any prison in the United Kingdom and, in 2004, Strangeways had the highest number of suicides in the country.

Education and vocational training is provided by the Manchester College. Courses offered include information technology, ESOL, numeracy, industrial cleaning, bricklaying, painting and decorating, plastering, textiles and laundry. The prison's gym runs courses in physical education and offers recreational sport and fitness programmes.

In 2015, The Daily Telegraph reported that a drone aircraft was being used in an attempt to deliver drugs and smartphones to precise locations within the prison.

In 2016, Nicky Reilly, also known as Mohammed Saeed Alim, a Muslim convert was found dead in his cell after hanging himself. Reilly had a chronic history of self harm, he suffered from Asperger's Syndrome and a personality disorder. A jury decided it was "more likely than not" that he did not intend to die and "acted impulsively." It is unclear if Reilly understood the concept of death or could form the intent to die. Senior coroner, Joanne Kearsley said evidence given at the court raised "significant concerns." Kearsley said she was not convinced the prison had a clear plan and awareness of his needs and she questioned why he was not under a care programme approach (CPA) where care coordinators are given to individual prisoners. The coroner asked whether a type of review should be considered for prisoners with recognised lifelong mental health problems and chronic risk of self-harm.

In 2017, a report by the Independent Monitoring Board described Manchester Prison as squalid, vermin infested and reminiscent of Dickensian England. The report added that the prison urgently needed modernisation and assaults on staff have risen owing to staff shortages.

In 2022, Manchester City Council leader Bev Craig called on the Ministry of Justice (MoJ) to move HMP Manchester elsewhere in the region, as the building is "not suitable for the significant remodelling or expansion it would need to meet modern-day requirements for a prison". However, the MoJ said there were "no plans to close or relocate" the jail.

Notable inmates
 Joey Barton, footballer jailed for assault.
 Brendan Behan, Irish republican, playwright and poet, imprisoned in Strangeways in 1947 for attempting to free an IRA prisoner.
 Ian Brady, held for theft prior to the Moors murders.
 Mark Bridger – a paedophile who abducted and murdered a 5-year-old girl. Was held at Strangeways on remand; moved to HM Prison Wakefield after being sentenced.
 David Britton, author of Lord Horror, the last publication to be banned under the Obscene Publications Act.
Charles Bronson, a criminal who has been referred to in the British press as the "most violent prisoner in Britain" and "Britain's most notorious prisoner".
 Ian Brown, musician and singer-songwriter jailed for "air rage". Wrote three songs inside: "Free My Way", "So Many Soldiers", and "Set My Baby Free". Released in December 1999.
 Dale Cregan, held there on remand whilst awaiting trial for murder.
 Emily Davison, suffragette, sentenced to a month's hard labour in 1909 after throwing rocks at the carriage of chancellor David Lloyd George. Hunger strike led to force feeding. Blockaded herself in her cell and sued Strangeways for using a water cannon.
 David Dickinson, TV presenter specialising in antiques, imprisoned for fraud in pre-celebrity days.
 James Inglis, the world's fastest hanging.
Benjamin Mendy, French football player.
 Christabel Pankhurst, suffragette, was held for a week.
 Gordon Park, convicted in 2005 of murdering his first wife, Carol Park, in 1976.
 Harold Shipman, serial killer, who was held there on remand whilst awaiting trial.
 Reynhard Sinaga, an Indonesian serial rapist found guilty of assaulting 48 men, including 136 counts of rape.
Ray Teret – former radio DJ and friend of Jimmy Savile convicted of a series of sexual offences, including seven rapes, for which he was sentenced to 25 years in prison. Died at HMP Manchester in 2021.
 Catherine Tolson and Helen Tolson, suffragette sisters imprisoned in 1909 for breaking glass at White City in Manchester.

Cultural references
"Strangeways", a track on the 1987 rock album The House of Blue Light by Deep Purple.
Strangeways, Here We Come, 1987 album by The Smiths.
Strangeways, Here We Come, a 2017 comedy drama filmed in Salford.
'Mad' Frankie Fraser (1982) was held on 'A' Wing and excused boots for supposed fallen arches.
Eric Allison (1970) went on to be The Guardian Prison Reporter and author of A Serious Disturbance, an account of the Strangeways Riot. A chapter of Eric's book was written by former Strangeways Hospital Officer John G. Sutton.
In the song "There Goes a Tenner" from the album The Dreaming, Kate Bush sings of being "a star in Strangeways". The song is about a botched bank robbery.
The song "Fallowfield Hillbilly", from the album St. Jude by Manchester band The Courteeners, refers to Strangeways and the type of people that "indie snobs" perceive to be its inmates.
In the comic Hellblazer, issue 34 (October 1990), the main character John Constantine refers to Strangeways prison "exploding with [excrement] and blood," and describes its holding cells as "Victorian pressure cookers" into which government officials who turn a blind eye should be squeezed to "see what pops out of [their] pimple."
In his poem "Are You the Business?", John Cooper Clarke asks "Is Strangeways full of prisoners?".
In the TV series Shameless, Frank Gallagher often refers to his time in Strangeways.
In the TV series Beautiful People, Debbie Doonan, who dislikes the police, shouts to an officer "them blokes from Strangeways had the right idea," a reference to the Strangeways Prison riot.
Graham Fellows, in his comedic persona of John Shuttleworth, wrote a song that began, "You're like Manchester, you've got strange ways".
"Strangeways Hotel", a song by Mike Harding.
 In the book Pollen by Mancunian author Jeff Noon two of the central characters visit Strangeways in order to speak to a prisoner. The prison has become a "Virtual" (sic) prison, where the inmates are kept locked in drawers on large amounts of a psychoactive drug that puts them into a permanent, pleasant dreamlike state.
 Strangeways was the name of the "prison cat" in the 1960 movie Two-Way Stretch, a comedy set inside a fictitious Manchester Prison which starred Peter Sellers, Lionel Jefferies and Wilfrid Hyde-White.
 In an episode of Hancock's Half Hour, Bill Kerr defends Sid James's character with the words  - "He's not a criminal - he's just got strange ways."
 In the Welsh sitcom High Hopes, Richard 'Fagin' Hepplewhite served eight years in Strangeways for second degree murder.

See also
Listed buildings in Manchester-M60

References

Bibliography

External links

Capital punishments executed at Strangeways, Manchester in the 20th century
Ministry of Justice pages on Manchester

Government buildings completed in 1869
Infrastructure completed in 1869
Category A prisons in England
Prisons in Greater Manchester
1869 establishments in England
Grade II listed buildings in Manchester
Alfred Waterhouse buildings
Execution sites in England